Sciusceddu is a soup in Sicilian cuisine prepared using meatballs and broken eggs as primary ingredients, served as a traditional Easter dish in Messina in Sicily. Additional ingredients used include broth, caciocavallo and ricotta cheeses, parsley, salt and pepper. It can be prepared in a similar style to egg drop soup.

Etymology
Juscellum, the Latin word from which the Sicilian name is based upon, was a dish in Ancient Roman cuisine which was included in Apicius, a Roman recipe book that is believed to have been written in the late 4th or early 5th century.

See also

 List of Italian soups
 List of soups

Notes

References

Italian soups
Cuisine of Sicily
Cuisine of Messina
Soups